Underground railway may refer to:

The Underground Railroad, a network of clandestine routes by which African slaves in the 19th century United States attempted to escape
Rapid transit, urban railways that sometimes use tunnels
 Mine railway